Enn Kraam (born Enn Kram; 20 July 1943, Uusküla – 18 June 2001) was an Estonian actor.

In 1965 he graduated from Tallinn State Conservatory. From 1965 to 1992 he worked at the Noorsooteater, and from 1994 to 2001 at Ugala Theatre.

Selected filmography

 1967 Keskpäevane praam (feature film; role: Boy)
 1970 Valge laev (feature film; role: Juhan Saks)
 1971 Metskapten (feature film; role: Antti)
 1971	Tuuline rand (feature film; role: Pastor)
 1975 Indrek (feature film; role: Tigapuu)
 1977 Surma hinda küsi surnutelt (feature film; role: ?)
 1989 Regina (feature film; role: Karla)
 1991	Surmatants	(feature film; role: Father Eugenio) 
 1991	Vana mees tahab koju (television film; role: Andres Virkov) 
 1992	Lammas all paremas nurgas(feature film; role: Valvur) 
 1993	Suflöör	(feature film; role: Father) 
 1994	Tulivesi (feature film; role: Eerik's father) 
 1995	Wikmani poisid (television miniseries; Mr. Markson) 	
 1998	Kallis härra Q (feature film; role: Julius)

References

1943 births
2001 deaths
Estonian male film actors
Estonian male stage actors
Estonian male television actors
20th-century Estonian male actors
Estonian Academy of Music and Theatre alumni
People from Rapla Parish